Edwin Thompson Jaynes (July 5, 1922 – April 30, 1998) was the Wayman Crow Distinguished Professor of Physics at Washington University in St. Louis. He wrote extensively on statistical mechanics and on foundations of probability and statistical inference, initiating in 1957 the maximum entropy interpretation of thermodynamics as being a particular application of more general Bayesian/information theory techniques (although he argued this was already implicit in the works of Josiah Willard Gibbs). Jaynes strongly promoted the interpretation of probability theory as an extension of logic.

In 1963, together with Fred Cummings, he modeled the evolution of a two-level atom in an electromagnetic field, in a fully quantized way. This model is known as the Jaynes–Cummings model.

A particular focus of his work was the construction of logical principles for assigning prior probability distributions; see the principle of maximum entropy, the principle of maximum caliber, the principle of transformation groups and Laplace's principle of indifference. Other contributions include the mind projection fallacy.

Jaynes' book, Probability Theory: The Logic of Science (2003) gathers various threads of modern thinking about Bayesian probability and statistical inference, develops the notion of probability theory as extended logic, and contrasts the advantages of Bayesian techniques with the results of other approaches. This book, which he dedicated to Harold Jeffreys, was published posthumously in 2003 (from an incomplete manuscript that was edited by Larry Bretthorst).

See also
Differential entropy
Limiting density of discrete points
Aubrey Clayton, a contemporary exponent of Jaynes' methods applied to mathematical research in the social sciences.

References

External links

 
 Edwin Thompson Jaynes. Probability Theory: The Logic of Science. Cambridge University Press, (2003).  .
 Early (1994) version (fragmentary) of Probability Theory: The Logic of Science. Book no longer downloadable for copyright reasons.
 A comprehensive web page on E. T. Jaynes's life and work.
 ET Jaynes' obituary at Washington University
 http://bayes.wustl.edu/etj/articles/entropy.concentration.pdf Jaynes' analysis of Rudolph Wolf's dice data

1922 births
1998 deaths
American agnostics
20th-century American physicists
American statisticians
Washington University in St. Louis faculty
Washington University in St. Louis mathematicians
Washington University physicists
Physicists from Missouri
Mathematicians from Missouri
Scientists from Missouri
20th-century American mathematicians
Statistical physicists
Information theorists
Probability theorists
Cornell College alumni
Bayesian statisticians